This article deals with the system of transport in Belgrade, both public and private.

Urban
Belgrade has an extensive public transport system, which consists of buses, trams, trolley buses and trains operated by the city-owned GSP Belgrade and several private companies. All companies participate in Integrated Tariff System (ITS), which makes tickets transferable between companies and vehicle types. Tickets can be purchased in numerous kiosks or from the driver. They must be validated inside the vehicle and are valid for one ride only. On February 1, 2012, BusPlus, a modern electronic system for managing vehicles and transportation tickets in public transport was introduced, a system based on a vague contract which does not explicitly state the profit made by Apex Technology Solutions, and the giveaway of advertising space on bus stations.

Buses

The main Belgrade Bus Station is located at Železnička 4.

City public bus transportation is operated by 7 main carriers:
Gradsko saobraćajno preduzeće Beograd (GSP) – city-owned company
Saobraćajno preduzeće Lasta
Udruženje privatnih prevoznika (Association of private carriers)
Arriva LUV
Poslovno udruženje Beobus
Tamnava trans
Domiko

There are 149 regular lines and 25 night lines. Night lines are 15, 26, 27, 29, 31, 32, 33, 37, 47, 48, 51, 56, 68, 75, 101, 202, 301, 304, 308, 401, 511, 601, 603, 704, 706.

Presto: 15, 26, 101, 601Arriva (formerly Veolia): 47, 48, 51, 56, 68, 202, 706Ćurdić: 32, 33, 304, 603, 704Lasta: 31, 37, 308, 401, 511LUI Travel: 27, 29, 75, 301

Night lines that are abolished are: 7, 9, 11, 96, 701. Night lines that are introduced are: 33, 37, 48, 704 and 706. Night line 304 goes as trolleybus line 28 (Makedonska - Svetogorska - Takovska - Jaše Prodanovića - Cvijićeva - Dimitrija Tucovića) and her next route is: Batutova - Bulevar kralja Aleksandra - Smederevski put - Profesora Vasića - Palih boraca - Miloša Obrenovića - Vinča - Miloša Obrenovića - Palih boraca - Profesora Vasića - Smederevski put - Kružni put - Ravan - Leštane - Ravan - Kružni put - Smederevski put - Put za Boleč - Maršala Tita - Jumbina - Boleč - Jumbina - Maršala Tita - Put za Boleč - Smederevski put - Put za Ritopek - Maršala Tita - Ritopek. Night line 401 goes as tramway line 10 (Cara Dušana - Džordža Vašingtona - 27. marta - Starine Novaka - Beogradska - Trg Slavija - Bulevar oslobođenja - Trg oslobođenja - Vojvode Stepe - Bebelova - Baštovanska) and her next route is: Paunova - Bulevar oslobođenja - Put za Avalu - Vase Čarapića - Beli potok - Vase Čarapića - Put za Avalu - Put za Pinosavu - Pinosava.

Each of the regular lines is operated by GSP and by one of the other carriers, while night lines are conducted only by private carriers.

Private carriers were introduced in 1990s after many strikes in GSP, which had the monopoly till then. There were many unsuccessful efforts by the city after 2000 to unify them into the same ticket system. Finally, in 2004 it was agreed that ITS (integrated tariff system) will be introduced. These 6 companies will carry the public transportation till 2012, when the City Government will decide whether GSP is going to remain the only transport company.

City Bus Lines:
 15 – Zeleni venаc – Zemun (Novi grаd)
 16 – Kаrаburmа 2 – New Belgrade (Pohorskа street)
 17 – Konjаrnik – Zemun (Gornji grаd)
 18 – Medаković 3 – Zemun (Bаčkа street)
 20 – Mirijevo 3 – Veliki Mokri Lug
 23 – Kаrаburmа 2 – Vidikovаc
 24 – Dorćol (SRC ″Milan Muškаtirović″) – Neimаr
 25 – Kаrаburmа 2 – Kumodrаž 2
 25P – Mirijevo 4 – MZ Kumodrаž
 26 – Dorćol (Dunаvskа street) – Brаće Jerković
 27 – Trg Republike – Mirijevo 3
 27E – Trg Republike – Mirijevo 4
 30 – Slаvijа (Birčаninovа street) – Medаković 2
 31 – Studentski trg – Konjаrnik
 32 – Vukov spomenik – Višnjicа
 32E – Trg Republike – Višnjicа
 33 – Pаnčevаčki most (Railway station) – Kumodrаž
 34 – Železnička stanica ”Beograd Centar” – Ul. Pere Velimirovića
 35 – Trg Republike – Lešće (Groblje)
 35L – Omlаdinski stаdion – Lešće (Groblje) (line has shorter route of line 202 and night line 202)
 36 – Železnička stanica ″Beograd centar″ – Trg Slavija – Main railway station – Železnička stanica ″Beograd centar″
 37 – Pаnčevаčki most (Railway station) – Kneževаc
 38 – Šumice – Pogon „Kosmаj“
 39 – Slаvijа (Birčаninovа street) – Kumodrаž 1
 42 – Slаvijа (Birčаninovа street) – Bаnjicа (VMA) – Petlovo brdo
 43 – Trg Republike – Kotež
 44 – Topčidersko brdo (Senjаk) – Viline vode – Dunаv Stаnicа
 45 – Zemun (Novi grad) – Blok 44
 46 – Main railway station – Mirijevo 2
 47 – Slаvijа (Birčаninovа street) – Resnik (Railway station)
 48 – Pаnčevаčki most (Railway station) – Miljаkovаc 3
 49 – Banovo Brdo – Naselje Stepa Stepanović
 50 – Ustаničkа – Bаnovo brdo
 51 – Main railway station – Bele vode
 52 – Zeleni venаc – Cerаk vinogrаdi
 53 – Zeleni venаc – Vidikovаc
 54 – Miljаkovаc 1 – Železnik – MZ Mаkiš
 55 – Zvezdara (Pijaca) – Stаri Železnik
 56 – Zeleni venаc – Petlovo brdo
 56L – Zeleni venаc – Čukаričkа pаdinа (line has shorter route of line 56)
 57 – Bаnovo brdo – Nаselje "Golf" – Bаnovo brdo
 58 – Pаnčevаčki most (Railway station) – Novi Železnik
 59 – Slаvijа (Birčаninovа street) – Petlovo brdo
 60 – Zeleni venаc – Toplаnа (New Belgrade)
 65 – Zvezdara 2 – Block 37 (New Belgrade)
 67 – Zeleni venаc – Block 70A (New Belgrade)
 68 – Zeleni venаc – Block 70 (New Belgrade)
 71 – Zeleni venаc – Bežаnijа (Ledine)
 72 – Zeleni venаc – Aerodrom „Nikolа Teslа“ – LINE TO THE AIRPORT
 73 – Block 45 (New Belgrade) – Bаtаjnicа (Railway station)
 74 – Omladinski stadion – Bežanijska kosa
 75 – Zeleni venаc – Bežаnijskа kosа
 76 – Block 70A (New Belgrade) – Bežаnijskа kosа
 77 – Zvezdara – Bežаnijskа kosа
 78 – Bаnjicа 2 – Zemun (Novi grаd)
 79 – Dorćol (SRC „Milan Muškаtirović“) – Zvezdara (Pijaca)
 81 – New Belgrade (Pohorskа street) – Ugrinovаčki put – Altinа
 81L – New Belgrade (Pohorskа street) – Dobаnovаčki put – Altinа
 82 – Zemun (Kej oslobođenja) – Bežаnijsko groblje – Blok 44
 83 – Crveni Krst – Zemun (Bаčkа)
 84 – Zeleni venаc – Novа Gаlenikа
 85 – Banovo brdo — Borča 3
 87 – Čukаričkа pаdinа – Bаnovo brdo (Zrmanjska) – Čukаričkа pаdinа
 88 – Zemun (Kej oslobođenja) – Novi Železnik
 89 – Vidikovаc – Čukаričkа pаdinа – Blok 61
 91 – Main railway station – Ostružnicа (Novo nаselje)
 92 – Main railway station – Ostružnicа (Kаrаulа)
 94 – Block 45 (New Belgrade) – Miljаkovаc 1
 95 – Block 45 (New Belgrade) – Borčа 3
 96 – Trg Republike – Borčа 3
 101 – Omlаdinski stаdion – Padinska Skelа
 102 – Padinska skela – Vrbovsko
 104 – Omlаdinski stаdion – Crvenkа
 105 – Omlаdinski stаdion – Ovčа
 106 – Omlаdinski stаdion – PKB Kovilovo – Jabučki rit
 107 – Padinska skela – Omlаdinski stаdion – Dunavac
 108 – Omlаdinski stаdion – Reva (Dubokа bara)
 109 – Padinska skela – Čentа
 110 – Padinska skela – Opovo
 202 – Omlаdinski stаdion – Veliko Selo
 302 – Ustаničkа – Grockа – Begаljicа
 303 – Ustаničkа – Zаklopаčа
 304 – Ustаničkа – Ritopek
 305 – Ustаničkа – Boleč
 306 – Ustаničkа – Leštаne – Bubаnj Potok
 307 – Ustаničkа – Vinčа
 308 – Šumice – Veliki Mokri Lug
 309 – Zvezdara (Pijаcа) – Kаluđericа
 310 – Šumice - Mali Mokri Lug
 401 – Voždovаc – Pinosаvа
 402 – Voždovаc – Beli Potok
 403 – Voždovаc – Zuce
 404 – Ripanj (Groblje) – Trešnja (Okretnica)
 405 – Voždovаc – Glumčevo brdo
 405L – Glumčevo brdo - Nenadovac - Karaula - Glumčevo brdo
 406 – Voždovаc – Beli Potok (Railway station)
 406L – Voždovac – Zemljoradinička street – Beli Potok (Railway station)
 407 – Voždovаc – Belа Rekа
 408 – Voždovаc – Ralja (Drumine)
 503 – Voždovаc – Resnik (Railway station)
 504 – Miljаkovаc 3 – Resnik (Railway station)
 511 – Main railway station – Sremčicа
 512 – Bаnovo brdo – Sremčicа (Nаselje Goricа)
 513 – Sremčicа (Nаselje Goricа) - Velika Moštanica (centar)
 521 – Vidikovаc – Borа Kečić
 522 – Novi Železnik - Milorada Ćirića - Novi Železnik
 531 – Bаnovo brdo – Rušаnj
 532 – Bаnovo brdo – Rušаnj (Ul. oslobođenjа)
 533 – Bаnovo brdo – Orlovаčа (Groblje)
 534 – Cerаk vinogrаdi – Ripаnj (Centаr)
 551 – Main railway station – Velikа Moštаnicа
 553 – Main railway station – Rucka
 601 – Main railway station – Surčin
 602 – Block 45 (New Belgrade) – SRC „Surčin“
 603 – Bežаnijа (Ledine) – Ugrinovci
 604 – Block 45 (New Belgrade) – Prekа kаldrmа
 605 – Block 45 (New Belgrade) – Boljevci – Progаr
 606 – Dobаnovci – Grmovаc
 610 – Zemun (Kej oslobođenja) – Jаkovo
 611 – Zemun (Kej oslobođenja) – Dobаnovci
 612 – New Belgrade (Pohorskа street) – Kvаntаškа pijаcа – Novа Gаlenikа
 613 – New Belgrade (Pohorskа street) – Radiofar
 700 – Bаtаjnicа (Railway station) - Bаtаjnicа (Railway station)
 702 – Bаtаjnicа (Railway station) – Busije
 703 – Bаtаjnicа (Railway station) – Ugrinovci
 704 – Zeleni venаc – Zemun polje
 705 – Zemun (Kej oslobođenja) – „13. mаj“
 706 – Zeleni venаc – Bаtаjnicа
 706E – Zemun (Kej oslobođenja) – Bаtаjnicа
 707 – Zeleni venаc – Altina – Zemun polje
 708 – Block 70A (New Belgrade) – Zemun polje
 709 – Zemun (Novi grаd) – Zemun polje
 711 – New Belgrade (Pohorskа street) – Ugrinovci

Tramways and trolleys

The first tram line was introduced in 1892. The current extent of the network track has been unchanged since 1988, though with some re-routings of the tram lines. Trams and trolleys are operated exclusively by GSP Beograd, and there are 11 regular tram lines and 7 regular trolleybus lines.
Belgrade has 11 current trams (2, 3, 5, 6, 7, 9, 10, 11, 12, 13 and 14). Tram line 2 (dva) is a circular line around the downtown, so often downtown is referred to as krug dvojke (the circle of line 2).

Tram Lines:
 2 – Pristаnište – Vukov spomenik – Pristаnište
 3 – Kneževаc – Slavija – Omladinski stadion
 5 – Kаlemegdаn (Donji grad) – Ustаničkа
 6 – Tаšmаjdаn – Ustаničkа
 7 – Ustаničkа – Block 45 (New Belgrade)
 9 – Banjica – Block 45 (New Belgrade)
 10 – Kalemegdan (Donji grad) – Banjica
 11 – Kalemegdan (Donji grad) – Block 45 (New Belgrade)
 12 – Bаnovo brdo – Omlаdinski stаdion
 13 – Banovo brdo – Block 45 (New Belgrade)
 14 – Ustanička – Banjica
Tram network and termini:

All the revenue service track is constructed as parallel double track with terminal loops. 
There are 8 revenue service loops in the system: Kneževac, Omladinski stadion, Kalemegdan, Ustanička, Tašmajdan, Block 45, Banjica, Banovo brdo. 
There are further 9 auxiliary loops: Pristanište, Slavija, Autokomanda, Trošarina, Radio industrija, Gospodarska mehana, Topčider, Railway station, Rakovica. Only the first three are actively used for cutting short during the schedule disruptions. The loops Slavija and Autokomanda are located in roundabouts and are normally used for the revenue thru-traffic. Other auxiliary loops are used only as alternatives during the closures. The last two loops (Rakovica and Railway Station) are defunct. The track at Rakovica is disconnected from the main line. The loop at Railway station was recently reconstructed but is completely out of use due to unworkable design. The circular line 2 does not use loops at its terminus at Pristanište. It makes the service stops on the main line instead.

Tram depots:

There are 3 tram depots in Belgrade. Sava is the central active service depot built in New Belgrade in 1988. Dorćol ("Lower depot") is the historical electrical cars depot from 1894 which is used only for auxiliary and overhaul purposes. It is co-located with the active service trolleybus depot. The two single-track lines leading to it are the only exceptions to otherwise parallel double track network in the system and are not used in the revenue service. The third "Upper depot" is the historical horse-drawn cars depot from 1892. It retains its track but was recently disconnected from the main line. The depot is completely void of trams and is now housing only the overhead wiring maintenance unit. The plans to adapt it into the public transportation museum have never materialised.

Trolley Lines:

The first trolleybus line was introduced in 1947 to replace trams on the central corridor Kalemegdan-Slavija. The network extent is unchanged since late 1980s, though with minor relocation of the central terminus from Kalemegdan to Studentski trg in late 1990s. Belgrade has 7 current trolleybuses (19, 21, 22, 28, 29, 40 and 41).

 19 – Studentski trg – Konjаrnik
 21 – Studentski trg – Učiteljsko nаselje
 22 – Studentski trg – Kruševаčkа
 28 – Studentski trg – Zvezdara
 29 – Studentski trg – Medаković 3
 40 – Zvezdara – Bаnjicа 2
 41 – Studentski trg – Bаnjicа 2

Trolley network and termini:

There are 4 revenue service terminal loops in the system: Studentski trg, Konjarnik, Banjica 2, Medaković 3. The peripheral termini Učiteljsko naselje, Kruševačka and Zvezdara have no purpose-built loops: the trolleybuses are circling around the city block instead.
Additionally, there are 3 auxiliary loops in the system: Slavija, Crveni krst and Banjica 1. The auxiliary loops are actively used for cutting short during the schedule disruptions (the line number carries the suffix "L" on the departures to be cut short). Crveni krst and Banjica 1 can be used only in the direction towards the peripheral termini, Slavija can be used in both directions.

Minibuses
In April 2007, six minibus lines were introduced (E1-E7, except E3) which criss-cross Belgrade. Minibuses are all air-conditioned, smaller and generally quicker than buses. However, tickets are bought inside a minibus and they are more expensive than ordinary ones – since minibuses are out of integrated tariff system.
Minibus City Lines:

A1.Slavija – Aerodrom „Nikolа Teslа“ /Express/ – LINE TO THE AIRPORT
E1.Ustanička – Blok 45
E2.Dunav stanica – Petlovo Brdo
E5.Zvezdara (Pijaca) – Novi Beograd (Blok 70) (line has almost same route as 50)
E6.Novi Beograd (Blok 45) – Mirijevo 4
E9.Dorćol (SRC "Milan Gale Muškatirović") – Kumodraž

Night Lines:
 15 – Trg Republike – Zemun (Novi grad)
 26 – Dorćol (Dunavska street) – Braće Jerković
 27 – Trg Republike – Mirijevo 3
 29 – Studentski trg – Medaković 3
 31 – Studentski trg – Konjarnik
 32 – Trg Republike – Višnjica
 33 – Trg Republike – Kumodraž
 37 – Trg Republike – Kneževac (line has shorter route of line 37)
 47 – Trg Republike – Resnik (Railway station)
 48 – Trg Republike – Miljakovac 2
 51 – Trg Republike – Bele Vode
 56 – Trg Republike – Petlovo brdo – Rušanj
 68 – Trg Republike – Block 45 (New Belgrade)
 75 – Trg Republike – Bežanijska kosa
 101 – Trg Republike – Padinska skela
 202 – Trg Republike – Veliko selo
 301 – Trg Republike – Begaljica
 304 – Trg Republike – Ritopek
 308 – Trg Slavija – Veliki Mokri Lug
 401 – Dorćol /garage/ – Pinosava
 511 – Trg Republike – Sremčica
 601 – Main railway station – Dobanovci
 603 – Trg Republike – Ugrinovci
 704 – Trg Republike – Nova Galenika – Zemun polje
 706 – Trg Republike – Batajnica

Lines that are ceased to exist:

 7 – Ustanička – Slavija – Block 45 (New Belgrade) (night line)
 7L – Tašmajdan – Block 45 (New Belgrade)
 9 – Banjica 2 – Block 45 (New Belgrade) (night line)
 11 – Tašmajdan – Kalemegdan – Block 45 (New Belgrade) (night line)
 13 – Kalemegdan (Donji grad) – Banovo brdo
 22L – Studentski trg – Trg Slavija
 27L – Vukov spomenik – Mirijevo
 34 – Admirala Geprata – Železnička stanica ″Beograd centar″
 34L – Železnička stanica ″Beograd centar" – Bolnica ″Dragiša Mišović″
 36 – Trg Republike – Viline vode – Dunav Stanica
 69 – GO Novi Beograd – Depo Sava
 93 – Pančevački most /Railway station/ – Zvezdara (Pijaca)
 96 – Trg Republike – Kotež – Borča 3 (night line)
 110 – Padinska skela – Široka greda
 302L – Ustanička – Restoran ″Boleč″
 306L – Ustanička – Leštane
 404 – Voždovac – Ripanj (Brđani)
 406 – Voždovac – Stara Lipovica
 552 – Main railway station – Umka
 600 – Bežanija (Ledine) – Dobanovci
 602 – Surčin – Jakovo
 606 – Surčin – Dobanovci
 701 – Trg Republike – Nova Galenika – Zemun polje – Nova Pazova (night line)
 E3 – Cerak vinogradi – Block 45 (New Belgrade)
 E4 – Bežanijska kosa – Mirijevo 3
 E7 – Pančevački most /Railway station/ – Petlovo brdo
 E8 – Dorćol (SRC ″Milan Gale Muškatirović″) – Braće Jerković

Rapid transit

Belgrade is one of the few European capitals and cities with a population of over a million which have no metro/subway or another rapid transit system.

Metro

The idea of a metro system for Belgrade has been around for nearly a century. The Belgrade Metro started construction in November 2021 and the first line is scheduled to open in the year 2028. It is considered to be the third most important project in the country, after work on roads and railways. The two projects of highest priority are the Belgrade bypass and Pan-European corridor X.

Inter-Cityrail

On September 1, 2010, as an "almost" metro line and the actual metro's 1st phase, the first line of Belgrade's new urban BG:Voz system, separate from suburban commuter Beovoz system, started its operation. The first line at the time connected Pančevački Most Station with Novi Beograd Railway Station and used the semi-underground level of Beograd Centar rail station, two underground stations (Vukov Spomenik and Karađorđev park) and tunnels in the city centre that were built for ground rail tracks to Novi Beograd. The line had just 5 stations (Pančevački most, Vukov spomenik, Karađorđev park, Beograd Centar and Novi Beograd, which it shared with Beovoz), was 8 kilometer long and the commute took about 16 minutes. Train frequency was from 30 minutes with 15 minutes frequency during rush hour. The line uses the stock similar to suburban Soviet/Latvian electric rolling stocks with upper current collectors including ER31 with 3 doors along the side of car. In April 2011, the line was extended to Batajnica, and in December 2016 to Ovča. The new line has a daily riding of about 18500. A new line from Ovča to Resnik is planned to open in 2018.

Suburban

Buses
Suburban bus transportation is conducted by SP Lasta. Beside Lasta, certain number of suburban lines are operated by other carriers, too. 
Suburban transport on the territory of Belgrade is performed within the integrated tariff system 2 (ITS2), with over 300 lines and 2,500 daily departures. The network of suburban lines spreads radially from Belgrade to the centers of the suburban municipalities, from which Lasta's local lines can be used to reach smaller places. Suburban buses depart from the Lasta Bus Station in Belgrade and from the terminus of Šumice near Konjarnik in the neighbourhood of Zvezdara and another in Banovo Brdo. Lasta transports passengers in the local transport in the areas of the Mladenovac, Sopot, Lazarevac, Obrenovac, Grocka, and Barajevo municipalities.
Bus Lines:

 351 Šumice - Grocka - Dražanj
 352 Šumice - Autoputem - Dražanj
 353 Dražanj - Živkovac - Šumice (autoputem)
 354 Šumice - Vrčin - Zaklopača - Grocka - Kamendol
 354A Živkovac - Grocka - Zaklopača - Vrčin - Šumice
 354B Šumice - Vrčin - Zaklopača - Grocka
 355 Dražanj - Kamendol - Grocka - Šumice
 355A Šumice - Živkovac - Dražanj
 355L Grocka - Kamendol - Umčari
 356 Šumice - Grocka - Brestovik - Pudarci
 361 Šumice - Grocka - Živkovac
 361L Dražanj - Grocka
 361B Šumice - Grocka - Živkovac - Dražanj
 362 Živkovac - Šumice (autoputem)
 363 Živkovac - Grocka - Šumice
 363A Šumice - Grocka - Živkovac
 363L Grocka - Kamendol - Živkovac
 366 Kamendol - Šumice (autoputem)
 366A Kamendol - Ilinski kraj - Šumice (autoputem)
 450 Beograd - Ralja - Sopot
 451 Beograd - Ralja - Staro selo - Stojnik
 451A Beograd - Ralja - Stojnik
 460 Beograd - Autoputem - Mala Ivanča
 460A Beograd - Autoputem - Drumine - Mala Ivanča
 461 Šumice - Vrčin - Ramnice
 462 Šumice - Vrčin - Jaričište
 463 Šumice - Vrčin - Jaričište - Ramnice
 464 Beograd - Autoputem - Mali Požarevac - Drumine - Sopot
 465 Beograd - Autoputem - Stanojevac - Sopot (polazak u 23:30 saobraća preko Slavije i nosi oznaku 4652)
 466 Beograd - Jaričište - Vrčin
 466A Beograd - Jaričište - Vrčin
 468 Beograd - Jaričište - Vrčin - Grocka
 470 Beograd - Ralja - Mala Ivanča
 470A Beograd - Ralja - Parcani - Mala Ivanča
 474 Beograd - Ralja - Parcani
 491 Beograd - Ralja - Mladenovac
 491A Beograd - Slavija - Ralja - Sopot - Mladenovac
 493 Beograd - Autoputem - Mladenovac
 493A Beograd - Slavija - Autoputem - Mladenovac
 494A Beograd - Autoputem - Senaja - Mladenovac
 499 Beograd - Autoputem - Senaja - Šepšin - Dubona - Mladenovac
 560 Banovo brdo - Barajevo
 560A Banovo brdo - Sremčica - Barajevo
 560E Banovo brdo - Barajevo
 561 Banovo brdo - Meljak - Baćevac - Guncati - Barajevo
 561A Banovo brdo - Guncati - Baćevac - Barajevo
 581 Beograd - Stepojevac - Vreoci - Lazarevac
 581A Beograd - Stepojevac - Vreoci - Lazarevac (Bolnica)
 581E Beograd - Stepojevac - Vreoci - Lazarevac
 583 Beograd - Stepojevac - Vreoci - Rudovci - Kruševica - Trbušnica
 583A Beograd - Stepojevac - Vreoci - Rudovci - Kruševica
 585 Beograd - Stepojevac - Mirosaljci (Gunjevac)
 586 Banovo brdo - Stepojevac - Veliki Crljeni
 588 Beograd - Leskovac - Stepojevac - Mirosaljci (Gunjevac)
 591 Banovo brdo - Vranić - Taraiš
 591A Banovo brdo - Vranić - Rašića kraj
 592 Banovo brdo - Vranić - Rašića kraj - Draževac
 593 Banovo brdo - Meljak - Šiljakovac - Vranić - Taraiš
 593A Banovo brdo - Meljak - Šiljakovac - Vranić - Rašića kraj
 593B Banovo brdo - Meljak - Šiljakovac
 860 Beograd - Obrenovac
 860E Beograd - Obrenovac
 861A Beograd - Mala Moštanica - Obrenovac
 865 Banovo brdo - Sremčica - Velika Moštanica
 904 Surčin - Obrenovac

Railway (now disfunct)

Similar to French RER, suburban rail system Beovoz was operated by Serbian Railways, the national railway company. In its final stage, Beovoz had six lines with 41 stations and 70 km length:

Line 1 Nova Pazova – Pančevo Vojlovica
Line 2 Ripanj – Pančevo Vojlovica
Line 3 Nova Pazova – Novi Beograd
Line 4 Pančevo Vojlovica – Valjevo
Line 5 Pančevo Glavna – Valjevo

This system became defunct in 2013.

The most of system's stations are now used for the BG voz system.

Taxi
Taxi service is operated by 24 taxi companies, and it's not very expensive (start is about 1.5 euros (150 Dinars).
Every Belgrade taxi company has to have 2 signs: a company unique sign and a smaller blue sign with 4 white numbers – a unique number of each vehicle of Belgrade taxi.

Bus
Belgrade is connected by intercity bus lines with all major towns in Serbia, while during summer and winter tourist seasons there are also special seasonal lines.
There is a good connection with the cities in Republika Srpska and North Macedonia. The international bus lines to Western Europe are mainly focused on Germany, Austria, Switzerland and France, where buses can be taken for all other destinations.

SP Lasta, besides suburban transport, carries passengers in intercity transport on regular lines in Serbia and Montenegro and Republika Srpska and in international transport, as part of the Eurolines organization.

Train

The Belgrade railroad network is currently under reconstruction . The massive reconstruction scheme of the Belgrade railway junction calls for completion of the new central Prokop railway station that is to replace the historical Belgrade Main railway station (Glavna železnička stanica) situated near the downtown and Sava river. Belgrade is directly connected by train with many European cities (Thessaloniki, Istanbul, Sofia, Bucharest, Budapest, Vienna, Kiev, Moscow, etc).

In addition, there are 5 more railway stations in Belgrade (Centar – Prokop, Dunav, Rakovica, Novi Beograd, Zemun). Some long distance and international trains do not call at Central Station, but at Novi Beograd.

A new central railway station has been under construction since 1977 at the site named Prokop. The new railway station will be called "Beograd Center"; upon its completion all Belgrade rail traffic currently handled by the old railway station situated near the downtown district will be transferred to the new station freeing thousands of square meters of prime real estate along the Sava and substantially easing the rail travel into Belgrade. After years of delay, this ambitious project is set to be completed in the next few years pending the new international tender for its completion set to be announced by the government at the beginning of March 2006.  The train terminals will be situated underground while the vast passenger terminal will be above ground featuring commercial spaces, possibly a hotel and other amenities.  Most of the rough work on the station's train terminals has been completed thus far.  Belgrade has been restricted in its use of its vast waterfront precisely because of the large rail infrastructure that hug the river banks of the Old Town. Completion of this station is signaling a major boom in Belgrade's waterfront development.

Air
The international airport, Belgrade Nikola Tesla Airport, is located 12 km outside the city. It is connected with the city by the Belgrade – Zagreb highway. Bus line of public transport number 72 and A1 connect Airport with downtown. Airport provides connections with many cities in Europe, Asia and Africa.
A major expansion of the airport in Belgrade has been detailed with a development deal signed with DynaCorp. Inc. to build a regional air cargo hub, but the plan has failed. Belgrade airport also plans to build a third passenger terminal and another runway; however this may not be feasible in the immediate future.

Batajnica Air Base is a military airport located in the Batajnica suburb of Belgrade.

River

Belgrade has a commercial port on the banks of Danube named Luka Beograd. There is also a tourist port on the banks of the Sava welcoming various river cruise vessels from across Europe. Belgrade has several impromptu sporting marinas near the islands of Ada Ciganlija and Ada Međica harbouring small sail boats and sporting/recreational vessels. There are no regular passenger lines from the Belgrade Port (Luka Beograd), although tourist and individual lines run occasionally. Answering to the need for a real sporting/recreational marina a detailed plan for a marina in Dorćol on the banks of the Danube has been presented to the public, and an international tender for its development has been announced.

Bridges

There are nine bridges over the Sava and two over the Danube river, listed below:

Sava
Obrenovac-Surčin Bridge (Most Obrenovac-Surčin), the two-lane road truss bridge over the Sava at Obrenovac — 30 km southwest of Belgrade, constructed by Mostogradnja between 1994 and 1999. The total length of the bridge is 446.5 m, with the longest span of 141 m. The bridge was originally designed to carry only two heating water pipelines, but was later redesigned and built as a road bridge with the two pipelines on side cantilevers. Finished in 2011.
Obrenovac-Surčin Bridge (A2 motorway) Six lanes expressway bridge under construction. Opening is late 2019.
The single-track railway truss bridge over Sava at Ostružnica — just outside the urbanized area of Belgrade, serving the freight bypass line. The bridge was badly damaged during the 1999 NATO bombing. Fully reconstructed in 2002.
Ostružnica Bridge (Ostružnički most) is the three-lane semi-highway girder bridge over Sava at Ostružnica on the Belgrade bypass motorway — constructed by Mostogradnja between 1990 and 1998. Total length of the bridge is 1,789.6 m, with a 588 m long continuous steel structure crossing the river in five spans. The largest span is 198 m. The bridge was bombed by NATO during the Kosovo war in 1999 and fully reconstructed by 2004. The additional three-lane span is currently under construction and it will be opened in March 2020.
Ada Bridge (Most na Adi) a 969 m long and 200 m tall pylon bridge with six-lane roadway and unlaid double-track mass transit right-of-way is opened in 2012.
New Railroad Bridge (Novi železnički most) over the Sava — a double-track cable-stayed bridge built in 1979.
Old Railroad Bridge (Stari železnički most) over the Sava — a single-track truss-bridge originally built in 1886.
Gazela Bridge (Gazela) — a single-span six-lane motorway bridge over the Sava, the main traffic artery into the city, built in 1970.
Old Sava Bridge (Stari savski most) — a 410 m long two-lane road and tram bridge. The main span is a tied arch bridge over 100 m in length. During World War II it was the only road bridge available in Belgrade, the current span being installed in 1942, and one of the few bridges in Europe which the retreating German forces failed to demolish. In October 1944, the bridge, already laden with explosives and prepared for demolition, was saved by a local resistance veteran Miladin Zarić who managed to cut the detonator wires. Adding new lanes and full reconstruction is scheduled for 2017. Total investment is 60 million Euros.
Branko's Bridge (Brankov most) — a 450 m long six-lane road girder bridge over Sava, connecting the center of Belgrade to the densely populated residential suburb of Novi Beograd. Originally built as Most kralja Aleksandra (Bridge of King Alexander) in 1934 it was a chain-bridge. The bridge was destroyed in 1941 and rebuilt in 1956 as a single-span bridgeč at the time it was the longest bridge of that kind in the world.

Danube
Pupin Bridge (Pupinov most) is the newest six-lane road bridge over the Danube. Named after scientist Mihajlo Pupin, it was constructed by the China Road and Bridge Corporation and opened in December 2014.
Pančevo Bridge (Pančevački most) — a 1,075 m long combined four-lane road and double-track railroad truss bridge over the Danube, originally built in 1935. It was destroyed during World War II, and rebuilt after the end of the war in 1946. The overhaul and installation of the second rail track was completed in 2015.

Roads

Belgrade is connected by motorways to Zagreb to the west, Novi Sad to the north and Niš to the south. The motorways feed traffic into a large interchange popularly called Mostar. A wide boulevard, Kneza Miloša street, connects the interchange to the city centre.

A traffic decongestion project named unutrašnji magistralni prsten ("inner ring road") is set to begin with the goal of easing the congestion in the city centre and on the motorways.

References

External links

 BelgradeMaps.com – Belgrade public transport maps
 Registracija vozila